In quantum physics, a bound state is a quantum state of a particle subject to a potential such that the particle has a tendency to remain localized in one or more regions of space. The potential may be external or it may be the result of the presence of another particle; in the latter case, one can equivalently define a bound state as a state representing two or more particles whose interaction energy exceeds the total energy of each separate particle. One consequence is that, given a potential vanishing at infinity, negative-energy states must be bound.  In general, the energy spectrum of the set of bound states is discrete, unlike free particles, which have a continuous spectrum.

Although not bound states in the strict sense, metastable states with a net positive interaction energy, but long decay time, are often considered unstable bound states as well and are called "quasi-bound states".  Examples include certain radionuclides and electrets.

An unstable bound state shows up as a pole with a complex center-of-mass energy.

Examples

A proton and an electron can move separately; when they do, the total center-of-mass energy is positive, and such a pair of particles can be described as an ionized atom. Once the electron starts to "orbit" the proton, the energy becomes negative, and a bound state – namely the hydrogen atom – is formed. Only the lowest-energy bound state, the ground state, is stable. Other excited states are unstable and will decay into stable (but not other unstable) bound states with less energy by emitting a photon.
A positronium "atom" is an unstable bound state of an electron and a positron. It decays into photons.
Any state in the quantum harmonic oscillator is bound, but has positive energy.  Note that  , so the below does not apply.  
A nucleus is a bound state of protons and neutrons (nucleons).
The proton itself is a bound state of three quarks (two up and one down; one red, one green and one blue). However, unlike the case of the hydrogen atom, the individual quarks can never be isolated. See confinement.
The Hubbard and Jaynes–Cummings–Hubbard (JCH) models support similar bound states.  In the Hubbard model, two repulsive bosonic atoms can form a bound pair in an optical lattice. The JCH Hamiltonian also supports two-polariton bound states when the photon-atom interaction is sufficiently strong.

Definition

For a concrete example: let  and let  be position.

If the state evolution of  "moves this wave package constantly to the right", e.g. if  for all , then  is not bound state with respect to position.
If  does not change in time, i.e.  for all , then  is bound with respect to position.
More generally: If the state evolution of  "just moves  inside a bounded domain", then  is bound with respect to position.

Properties
Let  have measure-space codomain .  A quantum particle is in a bound state if it is never found “too far away from any finite region ”, i.e. using a wavefunction representation,

Consequently,  is finite.  In other words, a state is a bound state if and only if it is finitely normalizable.

As finitely normalizable states must lie within the discrete part of the spectrum, bound states must lie within the discrete part.  However, as Neumann and Wigner pointed out, a bound state can have its energy located in the continuum spectrum.  In that case, bound states still are part of the discrete portion of the spectrum, but appear as Dirac masses in the spectral measure.

Position-bound states
Consider the one-particle Schrödinger equation.  If a state has energy , then the wavefunction  satisfies, for some 

so that  is exponentially suppressed at large .  Hence, negative energy-states are bound if V vanishes at infinity.

Requirements

A boson with mass  mediating a weakly coupled interaction produces an Yukawa-like interaction potential,

,

A scalar boson produces a universally attractive potential, whereas a vector attracts particles to antiparticles but repels like pairs.

 

and yields the dimensionless number

.

In order for the first bound state to exist at all, . Because the photon is massless,  is infinite for electromagnetism.

Note however that if the Higgs interaction didn't break electroweak symmetry at the electroweak scale, then the SU(2) weak interaction would become confining.

See also
Composite field
Resonance (particle physics)
Bethe–Salpeter equation
Cooper pair

References

Quantum field theory
Quantum states

Further reading